"The "A" Team" is a 1966 song and charting single by Staff Sergeant Barry Sadler. It was Sadler's second and final American patriotic hit song at the time of the Vietnam War, following the success of "The Ballad of the Green Berets".

The song's lyrics are about the basic twelve-man Special Forces unit.  It is a marching song in six-eight time with music by Leonard Whitcup Cimino to lyrics by Barry Sadler and Phyllis Fairbanks. The lyrics commence "12 men strong and true 12 men fight for you on their heads a beret of green 12 men, invincible, the A-Team."

"The A Team", the title song to Sadler's second album, made it to No. 28 on the U.S. Billboard Hot 100 on that year, but its success was seen as a disappointment following the No. 1 "Ballad of the Green Berets".

References

1966 singles
Barry Sadler songs
1966 songs
RCA Records singles